A seraph is a celestial being in Jewish and Christian mythology.

Seraph or its plural seraphim may also refer to:

Saints
 Saint Serafina (born 1238), Italian saint
 Seraphim of Sarov (born 1759), Russian saint

Aviation
Back Bone Seraph, a French paramotor design

Comics and literature
 Seraph (comics), a DC Comics superhero
 Seraphim, a character in the webcomic Megatokyo
 A series of humanoid robots in the webcomic Gunnerkrigg Court
Seraphs, the second novel in the Rogue Mage series by Faith Hunter

Film and television
 Seraph (The Matrix), a character in The Matrix film trilogy
 Seraphimon, a character in the anime television series Digimon
 Seraphim Falls, a 2007 western film starring Liam Neeson and Pierce Brosnan
 Seraph of the End, anime television series

People
 Seraph (video gamer), Shin Woo-young, South Korean League of Legends player
 Seraph Young Ford (1846–1938), first American woman to cast a ballot under equal voting rights law
 Seraph Frissell (1840–1915), American physician and medical writer

Games
 A character in the video game Shin Megami Tensei: Digital Devil Saga 2
 A faction in the video game expansion pack Supreme Commander: Forged Alliance
 A vehicle in the video game series Halo
 A character class in the videogame Elsword, "Code: Battle Seraph"
 A unit in the game Warhammer 40,000
 A character class in the game Ogre Battle 64: Person of Lordly Caliber
 In Tomb Raider II, the key to the Tibetan palace containing the Talion is named the Seraph
 Items used in the game Baroque for Wii representing an individual's highest level of thinking used to share ideas
 The alternative upgrade of an Angel in Heroes of Might and Magic V: Tribes of the East
 The top four members in the semi-angelic organization Cruxis in Tales of Symphonia are known as the Four Seraphim
 The human guard organisation in Guild Wars 2
Operator from Call of duty: black ops 3, call of duty: black ops 4, and call of duty: mobile.

Music
 Seraphim (band), a power metal band from Taiwan
 Serafin (band), a rock band from London
 Seraphim Records, a record label
 A song by Before the Dawn
 A song by Sigur Rós
 A member of the band Dark Fortress
 Autumn of the Seraphs an album by the band Pinback
 Glass harp or Seraphim an instrument comprising many glasses filled with water
 The Host of Seraphim, a song from the album The Serpent's Egg (album) by Dead Can Dance
 Le Sserafim, South-Korean girl group

Other
 HMS Seraph, name of two British ships including a World War II submarine
 Nashville Seraphs, a minor league baseball team based in Nashville, Tennessee, in 1895
 Rolls-Royce Silver Seraph
 Royal Order of the Seraphim, a Swedish order of chivalry
 Seraphim moth, the geometer moth Lobophora halterata
 Seraphim Papakostas, Superior of the Zoe Brotherhood movement in Greece from 1927-1954.
 Serapheim Savvaitis, Igumen of the Lavra of Saint Sabbas the Sanctified from 1957-2003.
 Seraphim Post, American football player

See also
 Saraph
 Seraphin (disambiguation)